Western Playland is a  amusement park located in Sunland Park, New Mexico. It was located in Ascarate Park in El Paso, Texas from 1960 until 2006, but after conflicts with El Paso County, owner Pat Thompson decided to move it to Sunland Park where the owner of Sunland Park Casino donated land right across from his casino.

It is home to the rides The Hurricane, Tsunami, El Bandido Roller Coaster, Round up, Tilt-a Whirl, Pharaoh's Fury, Scrambler, Himalaya, and more. 

The park is opened seasonally, usually March to October. It opens only during the weekends for most of the season, except for summer, its peak season, when they also open during the week.

See also
Magic Landing, former rival

External links
 Official website

Buildings and structures in Doña Ana County, New Mexico
Amusement parks in New Mexico
1960 establishments in New Mexico
Tourist attractions in Doña Ana County, New Mexico
Amusement parks opened in 1960